Chittobochiah Creek is a stream in the U.S. state of Mississippi. It is a tributary to Catalpa Creek.

A variant transliteration is "Ittobechi Creek". The name Ittobechi is derived from the Choctaw language, and it's purported to mean "one that causes fighting".

References

Rivers of Mississippi
Rivers of Lowndes County, Mississippi
Rivers of Oktibbeha County, Mississippi
Mississippi placenames of Native American origin